Nevels Corners is an unincorporated community in the town of Dayton, Richland County, Wisconsin, United States. The community was named after George W. Nevel, who had moved from Pennsylvania in the 1850s and established a farm in the area.

Notes

Unincorporated communities in Richland County, Wisconsin
Unincorporated communities in Wisconsin